This is the discography of American rapper Layzie Bone.

Albums

Solo studio albums

Collaborative studio albums

Mixtapes
Thug Luv (2011)
The Law of Attraction (hosted DJ Smallz) (2011)
Smoke With Me digital download

Guest appearances

Music videos

References

Hip hop discographies
Discographies of American artists